Selembao is a municipality (commune) in the Funa district of Kinshasa, the capital city of the Democratic Republic of the Congo.

It is situated in the south of Kinshasa. Selembao is one of the new settlements, located near the Kalamu and Kasa-Vubu hills.

Demographics

References

See also

Communes of Kinshasa
Funa District